Mayweather is a surname, and may refer to:

 Anthony Mayweather (born 1985), professional wrestler, also known as Crimson
 Earring George Mayweather (1927–1995), American blues harmonica player and singer
 Floyd Mayweather Sr. (born 1952), former boxer and current trainer
 Floyd Mayweather Jr. (born 1977), Olympic and professional boxer
 Jeff Mayweather (born 1964), former boxer and current boxing writer/trainer
 Roger Mayweather (1961–2020), boxer and boxing trainer of Floyd Mayweather Jr.

See also
Mayweather Promotions, a boxing promotional firm founded by Floyd Mayweather Jr. in 2007 
Travis Mayweather, fictional character portrayed by Anthony Montgomery in the television series Star Trek: Enterprise
Eyan Mayweather, album by Nigerian rapper Olamide, 2015